Khajura is a village in Pirojpur District in the Barisal Division of southwestern Bangladesh. It is known for its patali production.

References

Populated places in Pirojpur District